Jan Slater Lee Young (born December 19, 1983) is a Filipino Entrepreneur, multi-billionaire, actor, engineer, model and television personality from Cebu. Young is best known for winning Pinoy Big Brother: Unlimited in 2012.

Early life
Young was born on December 19, 1983, as the eldest of four children. He attended Sacred Heart School – Ateneo de Cebu in Mandaue for high school and graduated with a civil engineering degree from the University of San Carlos in Cebu City. Young was a varsity table tennis player and a competitive shooter. After graduating, he worked for his father's steel building manufacturing company in Mandaue City, Cebu, but eventually forwent his family business and worked as a civil engineer for larger companies such as Nestlé.

Career
In 2011, after finishing an acting workshop established by actor Pen Medina, Young decided to become a model and appeared on different catalogs across Cebu. During an interview with Sun.Star, Young stated that he was aspiring to be branded as a matinée idol.

Slater Young officially launched his career by winning the reality show Pinoy Big Brother: Unlimited. Young was dubbed as "The Hotshot Engineer of Cebu" and was also part of the first batch that entered the house. On Day 155 –  the Big Night at the Grandstand (March 31, 2012), he was proclaimed as the show's first male Big Winner of a Pinoy Big Brother regular season.  He garnered a total of 40.02% of votes with 18.58% lead from 2nd Big Placer, Pamu Pamorada.

Weeks after his winning, Young made several guest appearances in the network and with the premier of the new season of Pinoy Big Brother only a week after his victory, speculations rose that he is pressured of debuting quickly to the entertainment industry. On April 13, Young played his first acting role as a guest star in the series finale of E-Boy opposite Jessy Mendiola. On April 28, Young continued his acting stint via the drama anthology Maalaala Mo Kaya as Andrei with veteran actress, Dimples Romana, and PBB: Unlimited's 4th Big Placer, Paco Evangelista.

However, despite Young's retirement in entertainment career. he is known for being of one of the most popular influencers in the country. Young has gained over 600K followers and counting on his Instagram. He usually posts contents regarding to engineering, life lessons, and so much more in said social media platform. Young as well was called by Big Brother in various seasons to be a guest.

Personal life
On February 28, 2018, Young became engaged to his girlfriend, author and blogger Kryz Uy. The couple married nearly a year later, on February 17, 2019, during a luxurious but intimate ceremony at Shangri-La's Mactan Resort & Spa in Cebu. On December 1, 2019, they announced on social media that they were expecting their first child.

Filmography

Television

Film

Awards and nominations

References

External links

1987 births
Living people
People from Cebu City
21st-century Filipino male actors
Star Magic
Filipino actors of Chinese descent
Male actors from Cebu
Filipino people of Chinese descent
Filipino male television actors
Pinoy Big Brother contestants
Big Brother (franchise) winners
ABS-CBN personalities